The pinacoderm is the outermost layer of body cells (pinacocytes) of organisms of the phylum Porifera (sponges), equivalent to the epidermis in other animals.

Structure
The pinacoderm is composed of pinacocytes, flattened epithelial cells that can expand or contract to slightly alter the size and shape of the sponge. It also contains porocytes, oval-shaped cells extending from the pinacoderm to the choanoderm (the body layer containing choanocytes).

References 

Sponge anatomy